Cheval Blanc St-Tropez is a luxury hotel in Saint-Tropez, France. One of its restaurants, La Vague d'Or is run by French chef Arnaud Donckele. The hotel is part of the Cheval Blanc collection since 2019, managed by LVMH group.

Architecture

The hotel was built in 1936. The building completed major renovations in 2018, with the help of French architect Jean-Michel Wilmotte.

Restaurants 

Cheval Blanc St-Tropez has two restaurants and a bar, including La Terrasse and La Vague d'Or.

La Vague d'Or 

Cheval Blanc St-Tropez gastronomical restaurant is run by French Chef Arnaud Donckele. It is awarded three stars by Michelin Guide and five toques with a 19/20 rating on Gault Millau.

Rooms and suites 

The hotel in 2019 has 30 rooms and suites. Design was entrusted with Jean-Michel Wilmotte. Many of the rooms include Roger Capron ceramic artworks.

Spa 

The hotel includes a spa with four treatment rooms. Cheval Blanc Spa offers Guerlain products and procedures.

References

External links

 Hotel website
 About Cheval Blanc collection
 Cheval Blanc St-Tropez on CasolVillasFrance.com

Hotels in France
French Riviera
Buildings and structures in Var (department)